XRX may refer to:

 Xerox Holdings (Nasdaq stock ticker: XRX)
XRX (web application architecture)